11/6 12/10 is the debut studio album by electronic duo Tarwater, released on September 30, 1996, by Kitty-Yo.

Track listing

Personnel
Adapted from the 11/6 12/10 liner notes.

Tarwater
 Bernd Jestram – guitar, bass guitar, programming
 Ronald Lippok – lead vocals, drums, programming
Additional musicians
 Eike Morelle – viola

Production and additional personnel
 Klara Hell – design
 Rainer Jestram – photography
 Bo Kondren – production

Release history

References

External links 
 

Tarwater (band) albums
1996 debut albums